The Danish Defence Media Agency (abbrev. FMC) was a supporting agency to the Danish Defence. It was organizationally integrated as a part of the Defence Command, but supported the entire defence. It terminated operations on January 31, 2012.

It produced media and broadcasts for and about the Danish Defence, including the web-TV channel Forsvarskanalen.

The agency was also providing imagery to national broadcast services and newspapers, published the employee magazine Forsvaret and provided services for the Ministry of Defence as well as did media-training for military personnel.

39 persons were employed by the agency on its closing date and at the end it was under editorial management by Vickie Lind.

External links 
 Forsvarets Mediecenter (Danish), preserved after closing

References 

Military of Denmark
News agencies based in Denmark
Mass media companies based in Copenhagen